Boston Station may refer to:

United States
North Station, the southern terminus for some MBTA Commuter Rail lines and Amtrak's Downeaster service
South Station, the northern terminus for some MBTA Commuter Rail line and Amtrak's Northeast Corridor service

United Kingdom
Boston railway station, a station in Boston, Lincolnshire
Thorp Arch railway station - also called Thorp Arch (Boston Spa) - a former station in  Wetherby, West Yorkshire

Canada
Boston Bar railway station, a station in Boston Bar, British Columbia